This is a list of capacitor manufacturers and their headquarters location.

A
 AFM - United States
Aihua Group (Aishi) - China
 Alcon Electronics - India
 ANSAR -United Kingdom
 APITech - United States
  Arizona Capacitors - United States
 ASC - United States
 AVX - United States
 Amit capacitors limited - India

C
 CapXon - Taiwan
 Chang - China
 ChengX (Chengxing Electronic) - China
 Chinsan - Taiwan
 Cornell-Dubilier - United States
 Custom Supression - United States

D
 Darfon - Taiwan
 Daewoo Electronic Components - South Korea

E
 EEStor - United States
 Electrocube - United States 
 Epcos - Germany
 Europe Chemi-Con (ECC) - Japan
 Elna - Japan

F
 Fuhjyyu - Taiwan
 Frolyt - Germany

H
 Hitano - Taiwan

J
 Jaivic - India
 Jamicon - Taiwan
 Jackcon - Taiwan
 Jianghai - China
 Jicon - China
 Jun Fu - China
 JWCO - China

K
 KEMET - United States
 KOA - Japan

L
 Lelon Electronics - Taiwan
 Ltec - Taiwan

M
 Man Yue - China
 MFD - United Kingdom
 Mundorf - Germany
 Murata - Japan
 MYE Components India

N
 Nantong Jianghai Capacitors - China
 NIC Components - United States
 Nichicon - Japan
 Nippon Chemi-Con (NCC) - Japan

O
 OST / Ostor - Taiwan

P
 Panasonic - Japan
 Plastic Capacitors - United States

R
 Rubycon - Japan

S
 Samsung - South Korea
 Samwha - South Korea
 Samxon - Hong Kong
 Samyoung - South Korea
 Stackpole (SEI) - United States

T
 Taiyo Yuden - Japan
 TDK - Japan
 Teapo - Taiwan
 TK (Toshin Kogyo) - Japan

U
 United Chemi-Con (UCC) - Japan

V
 Vishay - United States

W
 Walsin - Taiwan
 WIMA - Germany
 Würth - Germany

Y
 Yageo - Taiwan
 YEC (Yeong Long Technologies) - Taiwan
 Yellow Stone - Taiwan

Defunct
 Mallory - United States - Defunct
 Sprague - United States - Defunct

 
Capacitors